Events in the year 1998 in Germany.

Incumbents
President – Roman Herzog 
Chancellor
Helmut Kohl (until 27 October 1998)
Gerhard Schröder (from 27 October 1998)

Events

 February 11-22 - 48th Berlin International Film Festival
 February 26 - Germany in the Eurovision Song Contest 1998
 June 3 - Eschede train disaster 
 September 1 - The German Federal Bureau of Aircraft Accident Investigation is formed.
 October 5 - Lanxess Arena in Cologne is completed.
 October 27 - The First Schröder cabinet led by Gerhard Schröder was sworn in.
 Date unknown - German company Volkswagen Group acquired British company Bentley, and Italian companies Lamborghini and Bugatti by its subsidiary Audi AG.

Elections

 1998 German federal election
 1998 Bavarian state election
 1998 Lower Saxony state election
 1998 Mecklenburg-Vorpommern state election

Births 
March 18 - Jamie-Lee Kriewitz, German singer
July 17 - Lilli Schweiger, German actress

Deaths
February 1 - Marga Faulstich, German chemist (born 1915)
February 10 - Erich Mückenberger, German politician (born 1910)
February 17 - Ernst Jünger, German soldier and author (born 1895)
February 26 - Otto Haxel, German nuclear physicist (born 1909)
March 13 - Hans von Ohain, German physicist (born 1911)
April 2 - Rob Pilatus, German model dancer (born 1964)
April 3 - Wolf Vostell, German artist (born 1932)
May 12 — Hermann Lenz, German poet and author (born 1913)
August 14 - Hans-Joachim Kulenkampff, German television presenter (born 1921)
October 30 - Heinz Westphal, German politician (born 1924)
November 6 - Niklas Luhmann, German sociologist (born 1927)
November 6 - Wolfgang Stresemann, German jurist, orchestra leader, conductor and composer (born 1904)
December 9 - Walter Horten, German aircraft pilot (born 1913)
December 11 - Max Streibl, German politician (born 1932)

See also
1998 in German television

References

 
Years of the 20th century in Germany
1990s in Germany
Germany
Germany